Hans Jürgen Kiebach (28 August 1930 – 19 May 1995) was a German production designer, art director and set decorator. He won an Academy Award in the category Best Art Direction for the film Cabaret.

Selected filmography

 Three Days of Fear (1952)
  We'll Talk About Love Later (1953)
 Diary of a Married Woman (1953)
 The Big Star Parade (1954)
 Love, Dance and a Thousand Songs (1955)
 Fruit in the Neighbour's Garden (1956)
 The Night of the Storm (1957)
 The Ideal Woman (1959)
 Brandenburg Division (1960)
 Grounds for Divorce (1960)
 Blind Justice (1961)
 The Return of Doctor Mabuse (1961)
The Curse of the Yellow Snake (1963)
 Love Has to Be Learned (1963)
 Breakfast in Bed (1963)
 The Phantom of Soho (1964)
 The Seventh Victim (1964)
 The Last Tomahawk (1965)
 The Defector (1966)
 The Peking Medallion (1967)
 Dead Run (1967)
 Hannibal Brooks (1969)
 De Sade (1969)
 Cabaret (1972)
 The Dead Are Alive (1972)
 Night Flight from Moscow (1973)
 Coup de Grâce (1976)
 Grete Minde (1977)
 Winterspelt (1979)
 The Magician of Lublin (1979)
 S*H*E (1980)
 The Formula (1980)
 The Apple (1980)
 The Passerby (1982)
 Otto – Der Film (1985)
 Das Rätsel der Sandbank (1985, TV miniseries)

See also
 List of German-speaking Academy Award winners and nominees

References

External links

1930 births
1995 deaths
German production designers
German art directors
German set decorators
Best Art Direction Academy Award winners
Film people from Berlin